Krystyna Ceynowa, also spelled as Cejnowa (died 1836), was an ethnic Polish victim of murder by lynching and an alleged witch. Accused of sorcery, she was subjected to the ordeal of water and drowned in Ceynowa (today Chałupy). She was the last person in Poland and among the last people in Europe to be subjected to lynching on the grounds of sorcery and witchcraft.

Background 
Krystyna Ceynowa was the widow of a fisherman, living at Ceynowa on the Hel Peninsula, in the Province of Prussia. She was regarded as suspicious by the community for various reasons, including the fact that she never went to church, and it was said that black crows were attracted to her chimney. This gave her a bad reputation in the eyes of the congregation and people suspected that she was a witch. However, the authorities at that time were not willing to conduct a witch trial, which at that time were illegal.

The murder 

In 1836, she was taken captive by a lynch mob determined to test her to see if she was a witch. Her suppressors were called from Zoppot, and she was subjected to the ordeal of water during an illegal trial. The ordeal took place in the Baltic Sea — she was transported in a boat and thrown overboard. To the disbelief of many, she remained afloat for a long time, which was taken as an evidence of witchcraft, as none realized that her gown and skirt had acted as a buoy. When Ceynowa did not drown, the people found her to be a real witch and killed her with their paddles or (according to another account) she was stabbed to death.

Her case demonstrates that a belief in witchcraft continued among the public long after the legal authorities stopped accepting the charges of witchcraft, and that people occasionally took the law into their own hands when they suspected witchcraft.

See also 
 Dummy, the Witch of Sible Hedingham
 Anna Klemens
 Barbara Zdunk

References

Sources
 Chałupy 
 Last European witch 
 Klaus Klöppel, Olaf Matthei: Polnische Ostseeküste (The Polish East coast)
 Nils Freytag: Hexenglauben im 19. Jahrhundert (Witch hunt in the 19th-century)

1836 deaths
Lynching deaths
Polish murder victims
Year of birth unknown
Witch hunting
19th-century Polish people
Witchcraft in Poland